No. 136 Squadron RAF was a short-lived RAF unit that saw no action in World War I, but upon reformation became the highest scoring unit in South East Asia Command during World War II. Shortly after the war the squadron was disbanded.

History

Formation in World War I
No. 136 squadron was formed on 1 April 1918 at Lake Down, Wiltshire, as a service unit (not a training unit), working up for the Airco DH.9, using a variety of aircraft. Following Air Ministry letter C4519 of 4 July of that year, however, it was disbanded, together with 12 other such units. Plans to reinstate the squadron in September as laid out in Air Organisation Memorandum 939 of 13 July 1918 came to nought as Air Organisation Memorandum 999 of 17 August 1918 cancelled these.

World War II

Reformation
The squadron was reformed at RAF Kirton-in-Lindsey, Lincolnshire on 20 August 1941 as a fighter squadron, flying Hawker Hurricanes and became operational on 28 September, doing shipping patrols and scrambles. This lasted only one month as the squadron was scheduled to move to the Middle East on 9 November to support Russian forces in the Caucasus and so protecting the vital Middle East oil fields.

On the road to...
On arrival in India the squadron was redirected to Burma, arriving there at Rangoon in early February 1942. However, because of the fast advance of the Japanese forces it was necessary to withdraw the squadron back to India again, 26 February to Dum Dum and a day later Asansol, and before the squadron had chances to become really operational. Attacks by the Japanese forces and accidents had the squadron with only six flyable Hurricanes left by this time.

India and Burma
Regrouped as an operational squadron on 31 March 1942 around Alipore, still on Hurricanes, the squadron provided convoy patrols and air defence of the Calcutta area, but in December it began operating detachments over the Burmese front and by the end of the month it moved to Chittagong to continue these operations from there. Returning to India at RAF Amarda Road in November 1943 for a training course, the squadron meanwhile had converted to Spitfire Mk.Vs in October and returned to the Burmese front with them in December 1943.

Ceylon and the Cocos Islands
In January 1944 the Spitfire Mk.Vs went to another unit and were replaced with Spitfire Mk.VIIIs. In July the squadron moved to Ceylon, flying from Ratmalana and later from Minneriya. At the end of March 1945, the Squadron ground echelon had left for the Cocos Islands and the squadron's aircraft began flying upon completion of the airstrip there a month later.

Malaya
After the Japanese surrender the squadron re-located to RAF Tengah, Singapore in October and from there went on to Kuala Lumpur, Malaysia in November 1945, where they received Spitfire Mk.XIVs and where it remained until 8 May 1946, when the squadron embarked for India. Arriving in Bombay, the squadron was disbanded on 8 May 1946 by being renumbered to No. 152 Squadron RAF.

Aircraft operated

Squadron bases

Commanding officers

References

Notes

Citations

Bibliography

 Bowyer, Michael J.F. and John D.R. Rawlings. Squadron Codes, 1937-56. Cambridge, UK: Patrick Stephens Ltd., 1979. .
 Flintham, Vic and Andrew Thomas. Combat Codes: A full explanation and listing of British, Commonwealth and Allied air force unit codes since 1938. Shrewsbury, Shropshire, UK: Airlife Publishing Ltd., 2003. .
 Franks, Norman L.R. Hurricanes Over the Arakan. Wellingborough, Northamptonshire, UK: Patrick Stephens Ltd., 1989. .
 Franks, Norman L.R. Spitfires Over the Arakan. William Kimber & Co Ltd., 1988. .
 Franks, Norman L.R. The Air Battle of Imphal. William Kimber & Co Ltd., 1985. .
 Halley, James J. The Squadrons of the Royal Air Force & Commonwealth 1918-1988. Tonbridge, Kent, UK: Air Britain (Historians) Ltd., 1988. .
 Jacobs, Vivian K. The Woodpecker Story. Durham, UK: The Pentland Press Ltd., 1994. .
 Jefford, C.G. RAF Squadrons, a Comprehensive record of the Movement and Equipment of all RAF Squadrons and their Antecedents since 1912. Shrewsbury, Shropshire, UK: Airlife Publishing, 1988 (second edition 2001). .
 Sturtivant, Ray, ISO and John Hamlin. RAF Flying Training And Support Units since 1912. Tonbridge, Kent, UK: Air-Britain (Historians) Ltd., 2007. .

External links

 Squadron history on RafWeb's Air of Authority - A History of RAF Organisation
 Squadron history at MOD site

136
136
Fighter squadrons of the Royal Air Force in World War II
N
Military units and formations established in 1918
1918 establishments in the United Kingdom
Military units and formations disestablished in 1946